Harry Mosco Agada was the lead vocalist of the band The Funkees, when the band split up after FESTAC 77, Mosco released solo albums under his name.

Between 1966 and 1969 and prior to the Funkees formation, Mosco was a musician with Celestine Ukwu's band. Thereafter, he founded The Funkees along with other musicians such as Chyke Madu. The band had success with two singles, Akula/Onye Mmanya and Akpakoro, following the success of the singles, the band move to England to widen their audience.

In 1977, the Funkees were invited to perform at FESTAC 77, following the event, the band went on a tour in Nigeria. After they returned to their base in the U.K., factions already developed among band members created a crisis that eventually led to the band's breakup. Mosco got label support from Nigeria businessman, G.A.D. Tabansi and released a solo album which was unsuccessful; during this early solo period, he also performed with Nana Love's band. Mosco's next two albums, Country boy and Sugar Cane Baby, were successful.

Mosco died in 2012.

Discography
Solo
 For You Specially (1978)
  Country Boy (1978)
 Peace & Harmony (1979)
 Sugar Cane Baby (1982)
 Heartbreak (1983)

References

2012 deaths
20th-century Nigerian male singers